Schoeller-Bleckmann Oilfield Equipment AG is an Austrian engineering company that specializes in the production of high-precision components and equipment for the oil and gas industry. SBO products include drill bits, downhole tools, and other specialized equipment used in the exploration and production of oil and gas.

Background 
It is a former subdivision of the Schoeller-Bleckmann group, a manufacturer particularly of steel products which was nationalised in 1946; the company was spun off in the period 1993-7. The company is based in Ternitz, south-west of Vienna. As of October 2015, it is a member of the Austrian Traded Index, the index of the twenty largest companies traded on the Vienna stock exchange. A subdivision is named Schoeller-Bleckmann Oilfield Technology.

See also 

 List of oilfield service companies

References

External links
 Company website 
 SBOT website (English)
 SBOT website (German)
Vienna Stock Exchange: Market Data Schoeller-Bleckmann AG

Oil and gas companies of Austria
Manufacturing companies of Austria
Industrial machine manufacturers
Austrian brands
Economy of Lower Austria